KLFI may refer to:

 KLFI-LP, a low-power television station (channel 35) licensed to Texarkana, Arkansas, United States
 the ICAO code for Langley Air Force Base